The Demographics of Kyrgyzstan is about the demographic features of the population of Kyrgyzstan, including population growth, population density, ethnicity, education level, health, economic status,  religious affiliations , and other aspects of the population. The name Kyrgyz, both for the people and the country, means "forty tribes", a reference to the epic hero Manas who unified forty tribes against the Oirats, as symbolized by the 40-ray sun on the flag of Kyrgyzstan.

Demographic trends
Kyrgyzstan's population increased from 2.1 million to 4.8 million between the censuses of 1959 and 1999. Official estimates set the population at  6,389,500 in 2019. Of those, 34.4% are under the age of 15 and 6.2% are over the age of 65. The country is rural: only about one-third of Kyrgyzstan's population live in urban areas.

The nation's largest ethnic group are the Kyrgyz, a Turkic people, which comprise 73.2% of the population (2018 census). Other ethnic groups include Russians (5.8%) concentrated in the north and Uzbeks (14.5%) living in the south. Small but noticeable minorities include Dungans (1.1%), Uyghurs (1.1%), Tajiks (0.9%), Kazakhs (0.7%) and Ukrainians (0.5%), and other smaller ethnic minorities (1.7%). Of the formerly sizable Volga German community, exiled here by Joseph Stalin from their earlier homes in the Volga German Republic, most have returned to Germany, and only a few small groups remain. A small percentage of the population are also Koreans, who are the descendants of the Koreans deported in 1937 from the Soviet Far East to Central Asia.

Kyrgyzstan has undergone a pronounced change in its ethnic composition since independence. The percentage of ethnic Kyrgyz increased from around 50% in 1979 to nearly 73% in 2018, while the percentage of Slavic ethnic groups (Russians, Ukrainians) dropped from 35% to about 6%.

The Kyrgyz have historically been semi-nomadic herders, living in round tents called yurts and tending sheep, horses and yaks. This nomadic tradition continues to function seasonally (see transhumance) as herding families return to the high mountain pasture (or jailoo) in the summer. The retention of this nomadic heritage and the freedoms that it implies continue to affect the political atmosphere in the country.

Vital statistics

Births and deaths

Statistics are taken from the United Nations Demographic Yearbook, the National Statistical Committee of the Republic of Kyrgyzstan, the Demographic Annual of the Kyrgyz Republic, and Demoskop Weekly.

Vital statistics

Population Estimates by Sex and Age Group (01.VII.2020):

Total fertility rate

2.95 children born/woman (2017 est.)

The differences in the number of children by nationality are significant: Uzbeks (3.0 children), Tajiks (3.0 children), Turks (2.9), Kyrgyz (2.9), Dungans (2.8) Russians (1.7), Koreans (1.7), Germans (1.8), Ukrainians (2.1), Tatars (2.1), Kazakhs (2.3) and Uyghurs (2.5). The TFR for Russians, Ukrainians, Germans, and Koreans in Kyrgyzstan are considerably higher than in their home countries.

Ethnic groups

According to the 1999 census, the ethnic composition of the population was as follows: Kyrgyz 72.6%, Uzbeks 14.4%, Russians 6.4%, Dungans 1.1%, Uyghurs 0,9%, other 3.6%, including Koreans 0.4% and Germans 0.4% (among them Low German-speaking Mennonites). Most Russians, Ukrainians, Tatars, Germans, and Koreans lived in northeast, especially around the city of Karakol. Most of the Dungans and Uyghurs are found along the Chinese border. Most of the Tajiks and Uzbeks live in the south. The emigration of non-Turkic people to Russia, Ukraine, and Germany is now negligible, in part because most of them left prior to 1999. For example, the number of Germans has fallen by over 90% between the 1989 and 2009 censuses. Kyrgyzstan decided to postpone its census scheduled for March 2020 by one month due to the COVID-19 pandemic, with further delays possible.

The table shows the ethnic composition of Kyrgyzstan's population according to all population censuses between 1926 and 2009. There has been a sharp decline in the European ethnic groups (Russians, Ukrainians, Germans) and also Tatars since independence (as captured in the 1989, 1999 and 2009 censuses).

Ethnic groups by region

Languages

Kyrgyz (official) 71.4%
Uzbek 14.4%
Russian (official) 9%
others 5.2% (2009 est.)

Religion

Islam 87.6%
Russian Orthodox 9.4%
others 3%.

See also

Demography of Central Asia

References